PLH Architects is an architectural firm based in Copenhagen, Denmark. It was founded in 1977 by Palle Leif Hansen.

Location
PLH Arkitekter is based in a former industrial complex situated in the Haraldsgade neighbourhood on the border between outer Nørrebro and Østerbro in Copenhagen. The buildings are the former home of Laurids Knudsens Mekaniske Etablissement.

Selected projects

Completed
 East Asiatic Company headquarters (now Alm. Brand), Midtermolen, Copenhagen (1998)
 Havnestaden masterplan, Islands Brygge, Copenhagen (1992)
 GeoCenter Møns Klint, Møn, Denmark (2007) 
 Aller House, Havneholmen, Copenhagen (2009) 
 Danish National Archives, Copenhagen (2009)
K 29, Vilnius, Lithuania (2013–2015)

In progress
 Harboes Brewery Visitor Center, Skælskør, Denmark
 Mærsk Building, Amerika Plads, Copenhagen, Denmark
 Trelleborg Visitor Center, Slagelse, Denmark

Gallery

References

External links
 Official website

Architecture firms of Denmark
Architecture firms based in Copenhagen
Companies based in Copenhagen Municipality
Danish companies established in 1977
Design companies established in 1977